Carlos Pedro Pires de Melo (born 6 April 1969) is an Angolan footballer. He played in 23 matches for the Angola national football team from 1989 to 2000. He was also named in Angola's squad for the 1998 African Cup of Nations tournament.

References

External links
 

1969 births
Living people
Angolan footballers
Angola international footballers
1998 African Cup of Nations players
Association football midfielders
Footballers from Luanda
Atlético Petróleos de Luanda players
Associação Académica de Coimbra – O.A.F. players
S.C. Espinho players
C.F. União players
Lusitânia F.C. players
S.C. Olhanense players
Atlético Petróleos do Huambo players
Angolan expatriate footballers
Angolan expatriate sportspeople in Portugal
Expatriate footballers in Portugal